Poème électronique (English Translation: "Electronic Poem") is an 8-minute piece of electronic music by composer Edgard Varèse, written for the Philips Pavilion at the 1958 Brussels World's Fair. The Philips corporation commissioned Le Corbusier to design the pavilion, which was intended as a showcase of their engineering progress. Le Corbusier came up with the title Poème électronique, saying he wanted to create a "poem in a bottle". Varèse composed the piece with the intention of creating a liberation between sounds and as a result uses noises not usually considered "musical" throughout the piece.

Original performance
The pavilion was shaped like a stomach, with a narrow entrance and exit on either side of a large central space. As the audience entered and exited the pavilion, the electronic composition Concret PH by  Iannis Xenakis (who also acted as Le Corbusier's architectural assistant for the pavilion's design) was heard. Poème électronique was synchronized to a film of black and white photographs selected by Le Corbusier which touched on vague themes of human existence. Le Corbusier's original concept called for a pause in the film while his voice was heard, speaking directly to the audience. However, Varèse objected to the idea that Le Corbusier's voice would be played over his composition, and the idea was abandoned.

The interior of the pavilion was lit by a constantly changing pattern of colored lights, and in addition to the film, three separate projectors showed still photos on the walls.

Spatialization
Varèse designed a very complex spatialization scheme which was synchronized to the film. Prefiguring the acousmonium style of sound projection, hundreds of speakers were controlled by sound projectionists with a series of rotary telephone dials. Each dial could turn on five speakers at a time out of a bank of 12. Estimates of the pavilion's sound system go as high as 450 speakers, but based on the limitations of the switching system and the number of projectionists, 350 is more reasonable.

The speakers were affixed to the interior walls of the pavilion, which were then coated in asbestos. The resulting appearance was of a series of bumps. The asbestos hardened the walls, creating a cavernous acoustic space.

The spatialization scheme exploited the unique physical layout of the pavilion. The speakers stretched up to the apex of Le Corbusier's points, and Varèse made great use of the possibilities, sending the sound up and down the walls.

Recording
The piece was originally recorded on three separate monaural tapes, two of which were in turn recorded onto a stereo tape with panning effects. The stereo tape and the remaining monaural tape were finally combined onto 35-mm perforated tape in order to synchronize the tape with the film and lighting changes.

Sequence of events
The images in Le Corbusier's film are all black and white still photographs and willfully abstract. The first image is a bull's head in a spotlight. The final image is a woman holding an infant. Le Corbusier assigned thematic sections to the film:

The sequence of sounds in Varèse's composition:

Bibliography

External links
 Virtual Electronic Poem project web site
 Virtual Electronic Poem project documentary on YouTube
 Marc Treib, Space Calculated in Seconds, Princeton, 1996
   Pictures on Google of the Philips Pavilion
 monaural rendering of Poème électronique

20th-century classical music
Compositions by Edgard Varèse
Electronic compositions
Modernist compositions
Spatial music
Expo 58
World's fair music
United States National Recording Registry recordings
Philips